Anil Kumar Yadav is an Indian politician. He was elected to the Lok Sabha, lower house of the Parliament of India from Khagaria , Bihar as member of the Janata Dal.

References

External links
Official biographical sketch in Parliament of India website

India MPs 1996–1997
1956 births
Lok Sabha members from Bihar
Janata Dal politicians
Living people